On April 2–5, 1957, a deadly tornado outbreak sequence struck most of the Southern United States. The outbreak killed at least 21 people across three states and produced at least 73 tornadoes from Texas to Virginia. The outbreak was most notable due to a tornado that hit a densely populated area of the Dallas–Fort Worth metropolitan area, killing 10 people and injuring 200 or more. The tornado, highly visible for most of its path, was at the time the most observed and best-documented tornado in recorded history; hundreds of people photographed or filmed the F3 tornado as it moved just west of Downtown Dallas. The film of this tornado is still known for its unusually high quality and sharpness, considering the photography techniques and technology of the 1950s. Damage from the Dallas tornado reached as high as $4 million (1957 USD). Besides the famous Dallas tornado, other deadly tornadoes struck portions of Mississippi, Texas, and Oklahoma. Two F4 tornadoes struck southern Oklahoma on April 2, killing five people. Three other significant, F2-rated tornadoes that day killed two people in Texas and one more in Oklahoma. An F3 tornado struck rural Mississippi on April 4, killing one more person.

Background
At 6:30 a.m. CST (12:30 UTC) on Tuesday, April 2, 1957, a low-pressure system was situated over the Texas and Oklahoma panhandles, with a warm front stretching into northern Louisiana and a cold front stretching along a surface-based trough into western Texas east of El Paso, Lubbock, and Amarillo. Temperatures on that day reached the 70s in northern Texas with dew points in the upper 60s to near . A strong upper-level jet, abundant instability in the atmosphere, and substantial wind shear provided additional fuel for the development of supercells across the region, particularly along and just north of the warm front. A capping inversion also helped maintain lifted indices of up to -7 through late afternoon, contributing to high convective available potential energy (CAPE) for severe thunderstorm development and tornadogenesis.

Impact
At around 3:00 p.m. CST (21:00 UTC), the first tornadoes touched down north of the Dallas-Fort Worth Metroplex area.

Outbreak statistics

Confirmed tornadoes

In addition to confirmed tornadoes, a possible tornado may have destroyed a home in the Woodlawn community, near Sherman, on April 2. Another possible tornado hit Ballard County, Kentucky, on April 3, unroofing homes, destroying a drive-in theater, and uprooting trees. A loud roaring noise was heard. Another tornado may have also struck near Tansill in Pope County, Illinois, on the same date. Two other brief tornadoes may have hit near Westlake and at Tallulah, Louisiana, late on April 4.

Dallas, Texas

At around 4:30 p.m. CST (some sources say 4:15 p.m. CST. As it first touched down, the tornado was barely visible, with only a debris cloud showing at the base of the thin funnel cloud. 13 minutes later, the tornado funnel became more visible and was seen clearly to touch the ground.

The tornado reached its maximum intensity, likely in the upper range of F3, as it approached the Trinity River. In this area, between Singleton Boulevard and Riverside Drive, homes were completely swept off their foundations, and nearby railroad cars were overturned; while such damage would usually be consistent with F4 intensity, the homes had been poorly constructed, lacking wall studding and being "set on piers  on center." Thus the tornado was officially rated F3, which is consistent with photogrammetric estimates of  peak winds in the worst-damaged area. The funnel then entered the rope stage and dissipated just north of Bachman Lake.

In all, the Dallas tornado killed 10 and injured at least 200 (some sources say 216) others. Damage was estimated at $4 million (1957 USD). The tornado completely destroyed about 131 (some sources say 154) homes, badly damaged 111, and mildly damaged 287. Nearly 600 (some sources list 574) structures and more than 500 homes were damaged, including between nine and 28 permanent apartment buildings that were completely destroyed. Some businesses and schools were also damaged, but the Parkland Memorial Hospital was narrowly spared, as was Dallas Love Field. Another, though officially unconfirmed, tornado in Collin County, north of the city, may have briefly touched down just east of the dissipating Dallas tornado and caused damage.

The Dallas tornado was heavily documented, filmed, and photographed by several eyewitnesses as it passed through residential and commercial areas of Dallas. The tornado was highly visible due to its slow,  forward speed, a lack of precipitation, and its coincidence with ideal, late-afternoon lighting. Occurring shortly before the end of the workday, the tornado passed just west of Downtown Dallas and was seen by many business and factory workers. Many TV studios had time to film the tornado from rooftops.

A researcher from the Severe Weather Forecast Unit in Kansas City noticed that several old theories were proven false during the Dallas tornado. One of the theories was that all air and debris flowed inward into the funnel and then upward, but on the outside edges of the funnel debris and people were even lifted. WFAA-TV in Dallas produced a 30-minute documentary about the tornado about one week later. The tornado became the subject of several scientific papers analyzing the life cycle of and wind speed speeds in a tornado. Among the studies was the first-ever photogrammetric analysis of wind speeds in a tornado. The film of the tornado is still regarded as being of exceptionally high quality and sharpness. Additionally, structural surveys following this and the Fargo tornado later in the year provided data that contributed to the development of the Fujita scale.

Non-tornadic effects
Severe thunderstorm winds reached  in Toledo, Lucas County, Ohio, on April 5.  hail occurred in Kiowa and Latimer counties in Oklahoma on April 2.

Aftermath and recovery

See also
December 2015 North American storm complex – Yielded an EF4 tornado in Rowlett and Garland that killed nine people, the deadliest in the Dallas–Fort Worth Metroplex since 1957
List of tornadoes and tornado outbreaks
List of North American tornadoes and tornado outbreaks
2000 Fort Worth tornado outbreak – Deadly F3 tornado struck Downtown Fort Worth and Arlington on March 28

Notes

References

Sources

F4 tornadoes by date
Tornadoes of 1957
Tornadoes in Texas
Tornadoes in Oklahoma
Tornadoes in Mississippi
1957 natural disasters in the United States
Tornado outbreak sequence